Wu Shu Nao Dong Jing may refer to:

Wu Shu Nao Dong Jing (novel), a novel from the late-Ming dynasty, which partly inspired The Seven Heroes and Five Gallants
A major sub-story (roughly Chapters 31–58) of The Seven Heroes and Five Gallants, a 19th-century novel 
Wu Shu Nao Dong Jing (1927 film), a film based on the novel
Wu Shu Nao Dong Jing (1948 film), a film based on the novel
The Invincible Constable, a 1992 film based on the novel
The Three Heroes and Five Gallants (2016 TV series), a TV series based on the novel

See also
Justice Pao (1993 TV series) — the last segment is called "Wu Shu Nao Dong Jing"
The Three Heroes and Five Gallants (disambiguation)
The Seven Heroes and Five Gallants (disambiguation)
Justice Bao (disambiguation)